The 1796 United States presidential election in Virginia took place as part of the 1796 United States presidential election. Voters chose 21 representatives, or electors to the Electoral College, who voted for President and Vice President.

Virginia voted for the Democratic-Republican candidate, Thomas Jefferson, over the Federalist candidate, John Adams. Jefferson won Virginia by a margin of 36.72%. Virginia chose electors by popular vote per electoral district and as such granted 1 electoral vote to John Adams.

Prior to the 12th Amendment, electors cast two votes, making no distinction if they were voting for Vice President or President, as such: Thomas Pinckney received 1 electoral vote, Aaron Burr received 1 electoral vote, Samuel Adams received 15 electoral votes, George Clinton received 3 electoral votes and George Washington received 1 electoral vote. It was well-known in 1796 that Jefferson and Adams were intended to be elected as president and Burr and Pinckney for Vice President.

Results

County results

See also 
 List of United States presidential elections in Virginia

References 

United States presidential elections in Virginia
1796 United States presidential election